There have been many famous modern circuses since the first modern circus was staged by Philip Astley in London on January 9, 1768. Many are best known by the name of their principal owner. The following is a list of both circuses and their country of origin.  For more information on circuses in general see Circus, or Contemporary circus, or for information regarding the ancient Roman circus, see Circus Maximus.

List

See also
History of Indian circus

References

 
Entertainment lists